Bagualing station is a station of Line 6 and Line 7 of the Shenzhen Metro. Line 7 platforms opened on 28 October 2016 and Line 6 platforms opened on 18 August 2020.

Station layout

Exits

References

Shenzhen Metro stations
Railway stations in Guangdong
Futian District
Railway stations in China opened in 2016